Matt Pryor may refer to:

Matt Pryor (musician) (born 1978), American musician
Matt Pryor (politician) (born 1960), American politician from Michigan
Matt Pryor (American football), American football offensive lineman

See also
Matthew Prior (disambiguation)